Melica minor is a species of grass in the family Poaceae. It is endemic to Caucasus.

Description
The leaf-sheaths are tubular and are closed on one end with its surface being glabrous.

The pedicels are filiform. Besides the pedicels, the spikelets have 2 fertile florets which are diminished at the apex. The sterile florets are also present and are barren, cuneate and clumped. Both the upper and lower glumes are keelless, membranous and oblong with acute apexes.

Its palea is 2-veined. Flowers are fleshy, oblong and truncate with 2 lodicules. The fruits have caryopsis with additional pericarp and have linear hilum.

References

minor
Flora of Asia
Taxa named by Pierre Edmond Boissier
Taxa named by Eduard Hackel